The Lion King is a platform game based on Disney's 1994 animated film The Lion King. The game was developed by Westwood Studios and published by Virgin Interactive Entertainment for the Super NES and Genesis in 1994, and was ported to MS-DOS, Amiga, Game Gear, Master System, and Nintendo Entertainment System. The Amiga, Master System, and NES versions were only released in the PAL region. It is the final licensed NES game worldwide. The game follows Simba's journey from a young cub to the battle with his uncle Scar as an adult.

Gameplay
The Lion King is a side-scrolling platform game in which players control the protagonist, Simba, through the events of the film, going through both child and adult forms as the game progresses. In the first half of the game, players control Simba as a cub, who primarily defeats enemies by jumping on them. Simba' roar consumes a replenishable meter, and can be used to stun enemies or solve puzzles. In the second half of the game, Simba becomes an adult and gains access to various combat moves such as scratching, mauling, and throws. Simba starts the game with a certain number of lives, depending on the difficulty setting; if he runs out of health or encounters an instant-death obstacle, such as a bottomless pit or a rolling boulder, he loses a life. Losing all lives results in a game over.

The player can collect various types of bugs. Some bugs restore Simba's health and roar meters, other more rare bugs can increase these meters for the remainder of the game, and black spiders reduce Simba's health. By finding certain bugs hidden in certain levels, the player enters bonus levels as Timon and Pumbaa to earn extra lives and continues. In Pumbaa's stages, he collects falling bugs and items until either one hits the bottom of the screen or he eats a bad bug, and in Timon's stages, he hunts for bugs within a time limit while avoiding spiders.

Development
The sprites and backgrounds were drawn by Disney animators at Walt Disney Feature Animation, and the music was adapted from songs and orchestrations in the film soundtrack. Game designer Louis Castle revealed that two levels, Hakuna Matata and Be Prepared, were adapted from scenes that were scrapped from the final movie.

An Amiga 1200 version was developed with assembly language in two months by Dave Semmons, who was willing to take on the conversion if he received the Genesis source code. He had assumed the game to be programmed in 68000 assembly, and the Amiga and Genesis share the same Motorola CPU family, but he found it had been written in C, a language he was unfamiliar with.

Westwood Studios developed the game for SNES, Genesis, and Amiga. Other conversions were outsourced to different studios. East Point Software ported it to MS-DOS, adding enhanced music and sound effects. The Sega Master System and Game Gear versions were developed by Syrox Developments, and the NES and Game Boy versions were developed by Dark Technologies.

Re-release
The SNES, Genesis, and Game Boy versions were included with Aladdin as part of Disney Classic Games: Aladdin and The Lion King, released for the Nintendo Switch, PlayStation 4, Windows, and Xbox One on October 29, 2019. The compilation was later updated as Disney Classic Games Collection: Aladdin, The Lion King, and The Jungle Book, which includes the SNES, Genesis, and Game Boy versions of The Jungle Book and the SNES version of Aladdin. It was released on November 23, 2021.

Reception

The Super NES version of The Lion King had 1.27 million copies sold in the United States. More than 200,000 copies of the MS-DOS version were sold. In the United Kingdom, it was the top-selling Sega Master System game in November 1994. In the United States, it was the top-selling Game Gear game in December 1994. In 2002, Westwood's Louis Castle remarked that roughly 4.5 million copies of The Lion King were sold in total.

GamePro reviewed the SNES version, commenting on outstanding graphics and voices but "repetitive, tedious game play that's too daunting for beginning players and too annoying for experienced ones". They particularly noted the imprecise controls and highly uneven difficulty, though they said the "movie-quality graphics, animations, and sounds" were good enough to make the game worth playing regardless of the gameplay. They similarly remarked of the Genesis version: "The Lion King looks good and sounds great, but the game play needs a little more fine-tuning".

The four reviewers of Electronic Gaming Monthly praised the Game Gear version as having graphics equal to, and controls vastly improved over, the SNES and Genesis versions. GamePro wrote that the graphics are not as good as those of the SNES and Genesis versions, but agreed that they are exceptional by Game Gear standards, and praised its much more gradual difficulty slope than the earlier versions. The November 1994 issue of Gameplayers says that "even on the easy setting, the game is hard for an experienced player".

Next Generation rated the SNES version four stars out of five, and stated that "even though the game is much harder than Aladdin, it's never unfair or frustrating".

Entertainment Weekly gave the Super NES version an A and the Genesis version a B+ and wrote that "controlling Simba when he's a playful bundle of fur is one thing; putting him through his paces as a full-maned adult is quite another. When the grown-up Simba gives a blood-curdling roar and mauls snarling hyenas, the interaction is so well observed that it's like watching a PBS nature documentary. The sense of power it gives you is exhilarating, and by the time Simba takes his climactic heavyweight stand against his evil uncle Scar, this Lion King has turned into a wild-kingdom variant of Street Fighter II". Super Play gave the Super NES version an overall score of 82/100, praising its graphics and sound as "almost film-like quality" and stating "a very high-quality platformer game with little in the way of innovation".

Accolades
In 2009, GamesRadar ranked the game seventh on its list of the seven best Disney games, saying "Every intricate level was designed with all the grace and detail of a classic Disney background, plus they managed to make a coherent game that stuck to the plot of the film". In 1996, GamesMaster listed the Mega Drive version 4th in its "The GamesMaster Mega Drive Top 10".

See also
List of Disney video games

Notes

References

The Lion King (franchise) video games
1994 video games
Amiga games
DOS games
Game Boy games
Game Gear games
Mobile games
Nintendo Entertainment System games
Platform games
Sega Genesis games
Master System games
Super Nintendo Entertainment System games
Virgin Interactive games
Westwood Studios games
Video games set in Africa
Amiga 1200 games
Video games developed in the United States
Video games scored by Allister Brimble
Video games scored by Frank Klepacki
Video games scored by Matt Furniss
Single-player video games
Promethean Designs games